Isibuko is a third studio album by South African singer Sjava, released through 1020 Cartel on January 27, 2022. Production was handled by his frequent producer Ruff. The album also features artists such as Emtee, Saudi, Anzo, Sampa the Great, Lolli Native, Delayde, Nontokozo Mkhize, Vernotile, Udumakahle, Q Twins, Umzulu Phaqa, Shwi and Mzukulu.

It debuted number one in South Africa.

Commercial performance 
Isibuko upon its release became the most streamed album surpassing 7.7 million streams in less than 7 days across all digital streaming platforms.

Track listing

Promotion 
Sjava announced Isibuko Tour to promote his album, first leg includes 3 dates; 18  March, State Theatre, 6 May, Cradle Boutique Hotel, Johannesburg and 27 May, Play House Theatre, Durban.

Release history

References 

2023 albums
Sjava albums